The Mysłowice-Wesoła coal mine is a large mine in the south of Poland in Katowice, Silesian Voivodeship, 260 km south-west of the capital, Warsaw. Mysłowice-Wesoła represents one of the largest coal reserve in Poland having estimated reserves of 232 million tonnes of coal. The annual coal production is around 3 million tonnes.

References

External links 
 Official site

Coal mines in Poland
Buildings and structures in Katowice
Coal mines in Silesian Voivodeship